Fit Pregnancy is a Web site for pregnant women and new mothers.

History 

Fit Pregnancy was founded as a magazine in 1993 by Weider Publications as a spin-off of Shape Magazine. Weider Publications was acquired by American Media, Inc. in November 2002. In 2015, Fit Pregnancy was acquired by Meredith, who closed its print edition.

Peg Moline is the magazine’s Editor-in-Chief.

Fit Pregnancy offers advice and health information from OB/GYNs and Pediatricians, such as Dr. Jay Gordon, Dr. Michel Cohen, and FitPregnancy.com's Ask the Labor Nurse blogger Jeanne Faulkner.

Fit Pregnancy's annual feature on The Best Cities to Have a Baby has been regularly featured on the NBC program Today.  The magazine encourages breastfeeding, fitness, and regularly features a column on Environmentalism.

Awards 

Magazine excellence:
 National Information Health awards
 19 Maggie Awards since 1999, such as for "Best Health & Fitness Consumer Magazine" for the October/November 2007 issue and for "Best Table of Contents" for the December/January 2008 issue.
 The Society of Publication Designers Award

Famous pregnancies 

Celebrity pregnancies which have been featured in the magazine include:  Jessica Alba, Gabrielle Reece, Courtney Thorne-Smith, Brooke Burke, Lara Spencer, Cindy Crawford, Alex Kingston, Ming-Na, Kelli Williams, Jada Pinkett-Smith, Jane Kaczmarek, Ana Gasteyer, Jenny McCarthy, Toni Braxton, Catherine Bell, Christa Miller Lawrence, Kimora Lee Simmons, Rachel Griffiths, Denise Richards, Kathryn Sansone, and Chynna Phillips.

Related articles, books, and DVDs 
 The New York Times: The End of Childbirth 101? November 12, 2007 
 Get Your Body Back After Baby Starring: Jennifer Gianni; Director: Linda Shelton Rating 
 Your Complete Guide to a Fit Pregnancy by FitPregnancy (Author), Peg Moline (Editor)

References 

Bimonthly magazines published in the United States
Fitness magazines
Magazines established in 1993
Magazines disestablished in 2015
Defunct women's magazines published in the United States
Online periodicals with defunct print editions
Online magazines published in the United States
Magazines published in New York City
IAC (company)